Zach Barack (born November 17, 1995) is an American actor, singer, and comedian. Barack voices the character Barney on Netflix's animated show, Dead End: Paranormal Park. He is known as the first openly transgender actor in a Marvel film, Spider-Man: Far From Home.

Early life and education 
Barack was born in Evanston, Illinois and grew up in the suburbs.

Work 
Barack has appeared on Netflix's Dead End: Paranormal Park and Marvel's Spider-Man: Far From Home. He has also appeared in episodes of Transparent and LA's Finest. He writes music and performs as a stand-up comedian.

Filmography

Film

Television

References 

Living people
American actors
American male actors
Transgender actors
1995 births